Ardiya is an area of Kuwait City, Kuwait; it is located in the governorate of Farwaniya. Its population in December 2020 was 63,560.

References 

Populated places in Kuwait
Districts of Al Farwaniyah Governorate